Buenos Aires is in the midst of a tourism boom, according to the World Travel & Tourism Council, which reveals strong growth for Argentina Travel and Tourism in 2007 and in coming years, and the prestigious travel and tourism publication;  Travel + Leisure, a monthly magazine, travelers voted Buenos Aires the second most desirable city to visit after Florence, Italy. Buenos Aires, regarded as the "Paris of South America", offers elegant architecture, exquisite cuisine, a legendary nightlife, and fashionable shopping. Argentina has become famous for its rich European flavor.

Tourist attractions

The most popular tourist sites are found in the historic core of the city, in the Montserrat and San Telmo neighborhoods. Buenos Aires was conceived around the Plaza de Mayo, the colony's administrative center. To the east of the square is the Casa Rosada, the official seat of the executive branch of the government of Argentina. To the north, the Catedral Metropolitana which has stood in the same location since colonial times, and the Banco de la Nación Argentina building, a parcel of land originally owned by Juan de Garay. Other important colonial institutions were Cabildo, to the west, which was renovated during the construction of Avenida de Mayo and Julio A. Roca. To the south is the Congreso de la Nación (National Congress), which currently houses the Academia Nacional de la Historia (National Academy of History). Lastly, to the northwest, is City Hall.

Avenida de Mayo links the Casa Rosada with the Argentine National Congress. On this avenue there are several buildings of cultural, architectural, and historical importance, such as Casa de la Cultura, the Palacio Barolo and Café Tortoni. Underneath the avenue, the first subte (metro) line   in South America, opened in 1913. The avenue ends at Plaza del Congreso, which features a number of monuments and sculptures, including one of Auguste Rodin's few surviving original casts of "The Thinker". 2007 list of the World's Best Cities, by Travel + Leisure Magazine. Today it still ranks in top 10.

The Manzana de las Luces ("Illuminated Block") area features the San Ignacio church, the Colegio Nacional Buenos Aires, and the old city council building (1894 to 1931). This area features tunnels and catacombs, which crossed underneath the Plaza de Mayo during colonial times. In the San Telmo neighborhood of,  Plaza Dorrego hosts an antiques fair on Sundays, complete with tango shows. They also have tango shows daily at the famous plaza. On weekends they involve many tourists to learn how to dance. Frequent tours and activities are also available at the Church of Nuestra Señora de Bethlehem, the San Pedro Telmo Parish and the Antonio Ballvé Penintetiary Museum. The National Historical Museum in Parque Lezama is a few blocks south. The Ayres Porteños Hostel is a very famous hostel as it is also a tourist attraction, it is decorated and painted by artists from La Boca and possesses a unique collection of local paintings among its walls.

The borough of Recoleta is home to a number of places of interest, including the Museo Nacional de Bellas Artes, the Biblioteca Nacional, the Centro Cultural Recoleta, the Faculty of Law of the Universidad de Buenos Aires, the Basílica Nuestra Señora de Pilar, the Palais de Glace, the Café La Biela and the Cementerio de la Recoleta, where Eva Perón's crypt can be visited, among those of many other Argentine historical and cultural figures.

El Ateneo Grand Splendid is one of the city's most well-known bookshops and, having moved from its original downtown location, today operates on Santa Fé Avenue, where "Barrio Norte" meets the borough of Palermo. Once a theatre and later a cinema, the building still retains the feeling of the grand theatre it once was, despite its recent renovation. Plaza Italia, site of a monument to Giuseppe Garibaldi, the Buenos Aires Zoo, the botanical gardens, and the Palermo woods (famous for its paddleboat lake, rose garden, and planetarium) are all a short walk to the east of it.

The borough of Retiro features the Retiro Railway Terminal and several other notable landmarks, including the Plaza San Martín square, its monument to the Falklands War Fallen, an equestrian statue of General San Martín and, nearby, the Anglo-Argentine community's present to Argentina the Torre Monumental (formerly Torre de los Ingleses), the ornate Basilica Santísimo Sacramento and the Art Deco Kavanagh Building, still one of the tallest in the city.

The Museo de Arte Latinoamericano de Buenos Aires is located in the barrio of Palermo, and is one of the most important in the country. In this neighbourhood can also be found the Bosques de Palermo, the Planetary and Buenos Aires Zoo.

The southern area of the city, (including barrios such as Barracas and Parque Patricios) while traditionally not a top tourist destination, is historically the source for much of the city's early tango culture. It is now home to a burgeoning arts scene. Another important tourist site is Avenida Corrientes; among dozens of cinemas, theatres, booksellers and music shops, this avenue is home to the San Martín Cultural Center, Paseo La Plaza and the Luna Park coliseum. At the intersection of this avenue with Avenida 9 de julio, the Obelisco, the emblem of the City of Buenos Aires, is located. The Art Deco Mercado de Abasto, which is currently a shopping mall, is also on this avenue.

At the southwest end of the city, the Buenos Aires circuit and the Parque de la ciudad are located. One of the biggest thematic parks in Latin America, the amusement park centers around its 200 metre-high Torre Espacial tower.

Buenos Aires has been attracting a homosexual community in Latin America.
 Since 2006, the city has seen unprecedented numbers of gay-oriented cruise ship arrivals, an increase in the number of gay-owned businesses, and the construction of a five-star gay-oriented hotel; despite its relatively unfavorable location, the Axel Hotel Buenos Aires has remained popular since opening in October 2007.

Hotels

Buenos Aires has various types of accommodation, from luxurious five-star to quality budget located in neighborhoods that are further from the city centre, although the transportation system allows easy and inexpensive access to the city.

There were, as of February 2008, 23 five-star, 61 four-star, 59 three-star and 87 two or one-star hotels, as well as 25 boutique hotels and 39 apart-hotels; another 298 hostels, bed & breakfasts, vacation rentals and other non-hotel establishments were registered in the city. In all, nearly 27,000 rooms were available for tourism in Buenos Aires, of which about 12,000 belonged to four-star, five-star, or boutique hotels. Establishments of a higher category typically enjoy the city's highest occupation rates. The majority of the hotels are located in the central part of the city, in close proximity to most main tourist attractions.

For the traveler desiring more independence and privacy, there is an abundance of furnished apartments for rent. These range from small, low-cost studios to expensive, luxurious apartments.

See also
Tourism in Argentina

References

External links
 Official City of Buenos Aires website

Buenos Aires
Buenos Aires
Buenos Aires